The Seventh Commandment may refer to: 

 One of the Ten Commandments
 The Seventh Commandment (1932 film), an American film directed by James P. Hogan
 The Seventh Commandment (1957 film), a French film directed by Raymond Bernard
 The Seventh Commandment (1961 film), an American film directed by Crown International Pictures

See also
 Seventh Commandment (disambiguation)